Pobres habrá siempre is a 1958 Argentine film directed by Carlos F. Borcosque.

Cast
 Daira Ceriani …Gisela Mazeiskas
 Domingo Alzugaray …Héctor José Olmos
 Nieves Ibar …Carola
 Isidro Fernán Valdez …Glaco Chuno
 Norberto Aroldi …Carabajal
 Jorge Rivera López …Eduardo Sandoval
 Jorge Villalba …Gregorio Olmos
 Darío Perkins
 Guillermo Bredeston …Manuel
 María Luisa Goldoni
 Hugo Llanos …Laurencio Monteros
 Andrés Balmelli
 Ernesto Nogués …Rafael Suárez
 Elisa Ladow …Operaria
 Roberto Bordoni …Stanley

References

External links
 

1958 films
1950s Spanish-language films
Argentine black-and-white films
Films directed by Carlos F. Borcosque
1950s Argentine films